Briones is a village in the province and autonomous community of La Rioja, Spain.

History
The name Briones comes from the Berones, ancient inhabitants of La Rioja, but according to a lithic site from the Bronze Age found in the path of the Santos Mártires chapel, Briones had inhabitants before the Beroners.
The Albedense Chronicle (c. 883) says that Alfonso I of Asturias cut down the village of Briones and six other municipalities. Moreover, the chronicle also mentions the famous expedition led by Alphonso I, king of Asturias all the way down the Ebro river in 740. In that chronicle, these destroyed villages are mentioned: Mirandam (now Miranda de Ebro), Revedencam, Carbonariam, Abeicam (Ábalos, where the expedition crossed the Ebro river), Brunes (this might be Briones but it is uncertain), Cinissariam (now Cenicero) and Alesanco.

Briones was under Saracen control until the late 9th century, and it belonged to King Ordoño II of León since the beginnings of the 10th century. 
Briones also belonged to the Castilla County, which had been repopulated with Basques and was a frontier between Castilla and Navarra. After Sancho el de Peñalén was murdered 4 June 1076, Alfonso VI took over La Rioja and Briones became part of the domain of Haro.
Fernando III named Don Diego López III de Haro, the monarch's nephew, first Lord of Briones.
In 1240 Don Diego López rebelled against Fernando III and found shelter in Briones. The king enclosed the town and made him prisoner. Since then, Briones belonged to the crown.
On 18 January 1256, Alfonso X of Castile gave Briones the regional laws from Vitoria, as a guarantee of the Castillian repopulation.
In 1293 Sancho IV gave Briones royal privilege.
During the Basquisation in 1536 there were thirty Basque surnames in Briones.

Demography
On 1 January 2010 the population of the town was up to 867 inhabitants, 464 men and 403 women.

Interesting places

Iglesia de Nuestra Señora de la Asunción 

It was built in the 16th century using the Isabelline Gothic style and was declared Bien de Interés Cultural in the monument category on 4 September 1981.

Other buildings 

 Ermita del Cristo de los Remedios
 Ermita de los Santos Mártires
 Ermita de Santa Lucía
 Ermita de San Andrés
 Ermita de San Bartolomé
 Ermita del Calvario
 Ermita de San Bartolomé
 Ermita de la Concepción
 Palacio de Marqués de San Nicolás: From the 17th century. Now the Town Hall
 La casa de los Gadea

Museums

 Vivanco Dinasty Wine Culture Museum
 Ethnographic Museum, aka La casa encantada

Historic-artistic grouping
Briones has been Bien de Interés Cultural in the Conjunto Histórico category since 4 July 1973.

Patronage festivals
 The first Sunday after 14 September, festivity of the Vera Cruz: remembrance of the advocation of the Santo Cristo de los Remedios, patron saint of Briones.

 Jornadas Medievales: third weekend of June. The inhabitants reproduce the life in the village during the 14th century.

Other interesting facts
In 2010 was published in TVE the TV series Gran Reserva. Part of it was filmed in Briones, but in the show it was renamed as Lasiesta.

See also

 List of Bien de Interés Cultural in the Province of La Rioja
 List of municipalities in La Rioja
 La Rioja (Spain)

References

Populated places in La Rioja (Spain)